Raphael Chiyya Pontremoli is the author of the Meam Loez on Esther and the editor of Simcha LeIsh by Rabbi Chaim Shunshol.

Biography
He was born in Smyrna (Turkey) from an important dynasty of rabbi. Potremoli's family came from Italy.

See also
Hiyya Pontremoli
Benjamin Pontremoli

References
Meam Loez on Yehoshua in English. No ISBN.

Book of Esther
Judaeo-Spanish
Turkish Sephardi Jews
Smyrniote Jews